The men's 1500 metre freestyle event at the 1952 Olympic Games took place between 31 July and 2 August, at the Swimming Stadium. This swimming event used freestyle swimming, which means that the method of the stroke is not regulated (unlike backstroke, breaststroke, and butterfly events). Nearly all swimmers use the front crawl or a variant of that stroke. Because an Olympic size swimming pool is 50 metres long, this race consists of 30 lengths of the pool.

Even though the top three swimmers were from different countries, all of them were of Japanese origin.  Ford Konno was Japanese American and Tetsuo Okamoto was Japanese Brazilian.

Medalists

Results

Heats
Swimmers was starting in six heats. Eight of them with best times qualified to final round. Shiro Hashizume in first heat established new olympic record.

Heat 1

Heat 2

Heat 3

Heat 4

Heat 5

Heat 6

Final

Key: OR = Olympic record

References

Men's freestyle 1500 metre
Men's events at the 1952 Summer Olympics